Darrell Strong (born May 21, 1986) is a former American football tight end. He was signed by the Oakland Raiders as an undrafted free agent in 2008. He played college football at Pittsburgh.

Early years
Darrel Strong was born in Ft. Lauderdale, Florida and played Quarterback for Plantation High School.

College career
Strong played college football for the Pittsburgh Panthers football program in Pittsburgh, Pennsylvania. During his tenure at the Pittsburgh program he played the Tight End position.

Professional career
In 2008 his professional career took off when he signed as an undrafted free agent by the Oakland Raiders in 2008. In addition to his professional career, after being cut by the Oakland Raiders, Strong was signed to the Sacramento Mountain Lions of the United Football League, this being where he recorded his only professional football touchdown.

External links

 
 Just Sports Stats
 Pittsburgh Panthers bio

1986 births
Living people
Strong, Darrell
Players of American football from Florida
American football tight ends
Pittsburgh Panthers football players
Oakland Raiders players
Sacramento Mountain Lions players